Chujō-ryū (中条流) is a koryū martial art founded in the 14th century by Chujō Nagahide, who studied under Nenami Okuyama Jion and his Nen-ryū style of swordsmanship.

History
Having benefited from the good graces of being on the right side of the Kenmu Restoration, Chujō Nagahide's family had prospered, allowing him to study the Chujō clan's style of swordsmanship in a time when swordsmanship was surpassed by the bow and arrow and spear.  Eventually he came to Nenami Jion's dojo.

References

Ko-ryū bujutsu
Japanese martial arts